Shannon Conley (also credited as Sonny Dey, Holly Bobbit, Ursula Conlon, Vibe Jones, Candi Washington and Deborah Zane) is an American voice actress and musician based in New York City. She has done voice work in English dubs of Japanese anime for Central Park Media and NYAV Post. She is also the former lead vocalist for the all-female tribute band, Lez Zeppelin. She made her Broadway debut in Hedwig and the Angry Inch as the understudy for the role of Yitzhak.

Filmography

Anime
 Ah! My Goddess – Urd
 Arcade Gamer Fubuki – Melody Honey – As Vibe Jones
 Grave of the Fireflies - Additional Voices
 Pokémon: Diamond & Pearl – Pokémon Hunter J
 Queen's Blade Rebellion – Annelotte, Dark Annelotte

Live action dubbing
 Cutie Honey (film) – Gold Claw

Non-anime roles
 As Told By Ginger – The Little Seal Girl
 Astonishing X-Men: The Motion Comic – Abigail Brand
 Ellen's Acres – Connie
 Kappa Mikey – Orie
 Newbie and the Disasternauts – Newbie
 Ratatoing – Powlo the Cat

References

External links 
 
 
 

Living people
Actresses from New York City
American voice actresses
Songwriters from New York (state)
21st-century American actresses
21st-century American musicians
21st-century American women singers
21st-century American singers
1970 births